The Eparchy of Batumi and Lazeti is an eparchy (diocese) of the Georgian Orthodox Church with its seat in Batumi, Georgia. It has jurisdiction over Municipalities of Kobuleti, Khelvachauri, city of Batumi in Georgia and historical region of Lazeti (Lazistan), currently part of Turkey.

Heads

See also
Georgian Orthodox Church in Turkey

References

External links
ბათუმისა და ლაზეთის ეპარქია

Religious sees of the Georgian Orthodox Church
Georgian Orthodox Church in Turkey
Dioceses established in the 20th century
Eastern Orthodox dioceses in Turkey